Hambro is a surname. Notable people with the surname include:

Calmer Hambro (1747–1806), Danish merchant and banker
Carl Joachim Hambro (1807–1877), Danish-born founder of the British bank Hambros Bank
C. J. Hambro (1885–1964), Norwegian journalist, author, and politician
Charles Hambro, Baron Hambro  (1930–2002), British banker and politician
Charles Eric Hambro  (1872–1947), British politician and banker
Charles Jocelyn Hambro  (1897–1963), Danish-born merchant banker and intelligence officer
Charles J. T. Hambro  (1834–1891), British Conservative Party politician
Christian Hambro (born 1946), Norwegian civil servant
Edvard Hambro  (1911–1977), Norwegian politician
Ellen Hambro (born 1964), Norwegian civil servant
Sir Everard Hambro (1842–1925), British banker
James Hambro (a.k.a. Jamie Hambro) (born 1949), British banker, businessman and philanthropist
Jay Hambro, British businessman known for being the chief executive officer of Aricom
Jocelyn Hambro (1919–1994), British banker, horsebreeder, and philanthropist
Johan Hambro  (1915–1993), Norwegian journalist
Joseph Hambro (1780–1840), Danish merchant, banker and political advisor
Larry Hambro (born 1961), American hotelier
Lenny Hambro  (1923–1995), American jazz musician who played woodwinds
Leonid Hambro  (1920–2006), American concert pianist and composer
Nicoline Hambro (1861–1926), Norwegian politician and proponent of women's rights
Peter Hambro (born 1945), founder of Peter Hambro Mining, one of the United Kingdom's largest mining businesses
Richard Hambro (1946–2009), British investment banker, horsebreeder and philanthropist
Rupert Hambro (born 1943), British banker, businessman and philanthropist
Tatiana Hambro (born 1989), British fashion writer and editor

Norwegian-language surnames
Danish-language surnames